The 3rd General Assembly of the Island of St. John represented the colony of Prince Edward Island, then known as St. John's Island, between 1779 and January 1784.

The Assembly sat at the pleasure of the Governor of St. John's Island, Walter Patterson. David Higgins was elected speaker; he was replaced by Walter Berry the following year.

Members

The members of the legislature after the general election of July 1779 were:

Notes:

External links 
 Prince Edward Island, garden province of Canada, WH Crosskill (1904)

03
1779 establishments in Prince Edward Island
1784 disestablishments in Prince Edward Island